Moses Mbye (born 13 August 1993) is an Australian professional rugby league footballer who plays for the St George Illawarra Dragons  in the NRL.

He previously played for the Canterbury-Bankstown Bulldogs in the National Rugby League, and at representative level for the Prime Minister's XIII, World All Stars and Queensland in the State of Origin series.

Background
Mbye was born in Brisbane, Queensland, Australia, and is of Gambian descent through his father, making him one of the few players in the NRL to be of African descent.

Playing career

Mbye played his junior rugby league for the Noosa Pirates. He played for the Pirates first grade side at age 17.

Early career
From 2011 to 2013, Mbye played for the Canterbury-Bankstown Bulldogs' NYC team. On 21 April 2012, he played for the Queensland under-20s team against the New South Wales under-20s team. In 2013, he captained the Bulldogs' NYC team. On 20 April 2013, he again played for the Queensland under-20s team against the New South Wales under-20s team. On 13 October 2013, he played for the Junior Kangaroos against the Junior Kiwis.

2014
In 2014, Mbye moved on to the Bulldogs' New South Wales Cup team. He played for the Bulldogs in the inaugural Auckland Nines tournament. On 14 March, he re-signed with the Bulldogs on a 2-year contract. In Round 8, he made his NRL debut for the Bulldogs against the Newcastle Knights, playing at centre replacing an injured Tim Lafai in the 16-12 win at ANZ Stadium. During the week leading up to the Bulldogs' 2014 NRL Grand Final against the South Sydney Rabbitohs, Mbye and Reni Maitua were both in contention to fill the vacant hooker role for the match after regular hooker and captain Michael Ennis was ruled out with a foot injury. Mbye was eventually given the nod over the more experienced Maitua in the 30-6 loss. He made 44 tackles, the most in the match.

2015
In the preseason, Mbye again played for the Bulldogs in the Auckland Nines. In 2015, he established himself as a regular part of the Bulldogs' side. His form saw the interest for his signature in 2017 rise significantly. In Round 4 against the Wests Tigers, he kicked a field goal in golden-point extra time to win the match for the Bulldogs, 25-24. In Round 7 against the Manly Warringah Sea Eagles, he scored his first NRL career try in the 28-16 win at ANZ Stadium. He finished off the 2015 season having played in 23 matches, scoring 3 tries, kicking 15 goals and 2 field goals.

2016
On 12 January, Mbye was selected in the Queensland Academy of Sport Emerging Maroons squad. On 13 February, Mbye extended his contract with the Bulldogs to the end of the 2020 season, earning around $750,000 a season. Mbye finished the 2016 NRL season playing in all of the Bulldogs 25 matches and was their highest point scorer with 100 points by scoring 9 tries and kicking 32 goals. On 24 September, Mbye played for Prime Minister's XIII against Papua New Guinea, playing off the interchange bench in the 58-0 win at Port Moresby.

2017
On 10 February, Mbye played in the 2017 All Stars match for the World All Stars, starting at halfback in the 34-8 loss. In Round 18, at Belmore Sports Ground, against the Newcastle Knights, the Bulldogs were losing 18-14 with two minutes remaining. A kick from Brock Lamb ricocheted into Mbye's legs and he then scooted away 80m to score. at the End of the year Moses Mbye was offered a contract from Samoa but denied it cause he wanted no injuries during the preseason.

Mbye finished his 2017 season with 22 games, scoring 2 tries and kicking 15 goals, with a total of 38 points.

2018
On 29 May, Mbye signed a four year deal to join The Wests Tigers starting 2019.  In June, he was granted a mid season switch to join Wests, he played his final game for Canterbury, a 32-10 defeat by the Gold Coast Titans at Belmore Oval which meant it was Canterbury's worst start to a season in 54 years.

Mbye made his first appearance for Wests Tigers on 1 July. He played in every game at fullback for the rest of the season, with the team winning 5 of those 9 matches, and scored 3 tries.

2019
With the arrival of new coach Michael Maguire, Mbye was named Wests Tigers' captain in the pre-season. Mbye contacted Benji Marshall and Jake Friend, uncertain whether he should accept the position. Team-mate Marshall said, "I don’t think he understands that when he talks everyone listens. The thing I like the most is he doesn’t enjoy shit standards. He doesn’t walk past things that he doesn’t like. He drives standards really hard. I think that is a big reason why he is captain."
Despite his club issues, Mbye played a starring role in Queensland Game 1 victory in 2019 State of Origin series.

Mbye collapsed at a hotel in Perth before the second game of the 2019 State of Origin series.  According to reports, Mbye was found slumped on the floor in the Queensland team's hotel. Mbye was lucky to have been found so quickly after falling into an anaphylactic shock, assumed to be the result of an allergic reaction.  Mbye was later medically cleared to play in Game 2 of the series as Queensland lost 38-6 at the new Perth Stadium.  Mbye was retained for Game 3 of the series as Queensland lost the match and the series overall in the final seconds of the game.

2020
Mbye made a total of 15 appearances for the Wests Tigers in the 2020 NRL season which saw the club finish 11th on the table.

2021
On 18 August, Mbye signed a contract to join St. George Illawarra starting in the 2022 season.  Mbye played a total of 22 matches for the Wests Tigers in the 2021 NRL season as the club finished 13th and missed the finals.

2022
In round 1 of the 2022 NRL season, Mbye made his club debut for St. George Illawarra in their 28-16 victory over the New Zealand Warriors scoring a try.
Mbye played 22 games for the club in 2022 as they finished 10th on the table and missed the finals.

References

External links
Wests Tigers profile
Canterbury Bulldogs profile

1993 births
Australian rugby league players
Australian people of Gambian descent
Canterbury-Bankstown Bulldogs players
Wests Tigers players
St. George Illawarra Dragons players
Queensland Rugby League State of Origin players
NRL All Stars players
Prime Minister's XIII players
Junior Kangaroos players
Rugby league five-eighths
Rugby league halfbacks
Rugby league players from Brisbane
Living people